Michael Davies (born 3 March 1966) is a United States-based British television game shows producer. He is best known for bringing the game show Who Wants to Be a Millionaire to American television. Since 2014, he has hosted a podcast entitled Men in Blazers alongside journalist Roger Bennett. Since 2021, he has served as the executive producer of the game show Jeopardy! following Mike Richards departure from the program after various controversies came to light.

Early life
Davies grew up in Blackheath, London and attended Mercersburg Academy in Pennsylvania, graduating from the University of Edinburgh. He is the younger brother of opera singer Rebecca de Pont Davies and screenwriter William Davies.

Career

Early career
In the early 1990s, Davies served as a development associate at Merv Griffin Enterprises.

Blogger
In 2002 and 2006, Davies wrote a blog about the 2002 FIFA World Cup and 2006 FIFA World Cup for ESPN.com.

Men in Blazers
Beginning in 2011, Davies and co-host and ESPNFC.com writer Roger Bennett, brought the Men in Blazers podcast to Grantland.com. The weekly podcast includes analysis of recent matches in the Premier League as well as coverage of the UEFA Champions League and various international fixtures, specifically the United States men's national soccer team games.

The duo were invited to provide analysis and humorous segments for ESPN live from Rio de Janeiro during the 2014 FIFA World Cup, especially from Bob Ley's "Panic Room". The duo did a live show from Portland, Oregon for the 2014 MLS All-Star Game, interviewing the likes of Clint Dempsey and Alex Morgan while raising money for MLS Works and the Wounded Warrior Project.

In September 2014, they conducted a New York City FC exclusive interview with Frank Lampard after Lampard joined NYCFC from Chelsea. Fox Sports announced in April 2014 they had cancelled the Davies-produced program Crowd Goes Wild, a daily sports talk show from the national sports network Fox Sports 1.

Ahead of the 2014–15 Premier League season, NBC Sports signed Davies and Bennett from ESPN for its English Premier League coverage and confirmed that Men in Blazers would have its own half-hour television show on Monday nights at 10 pm EST, starting 22 September 2014.

Davies and Bennett host the Men in Blazers channel on EA Sports Talk Radio on the official 2014 FIFA World Cup video game, with Andy Goldstein of TalkSPORT and Darke hosting the only other channel.

Sony Pictures Television

Embassy Row
As president and CEO of Embassy Row, a New York City-based television production company that is a unit of Sony Pictures Television, he was the executive producer of Wife Swap. He produced ESPN's 2 Minute Drill, VH1's World Series of Pop Culture, CBS's Power of 10, and the GSN originals: Chain Reaction, Grand Slam, and GSN's revival of The Newlywed Game, as well as the US version of Who Wants to Be a Millionaire.

Jeopardy!
In 2021, Sony appointed Davies to serve as interim executive producer of Jeopardy! when Mike Richards was let go after controversies came to light. On April 14, 2022, Davies announced that he would be taking over the position full-time. So far, under Davies' tenure, he has created daily box scores for each episode, creating a "Second Chance Tournament", creating a new holiday for the show entitled JeoparDAY!, as well as creating daily recaps of the shown known as Jeopardy! Highlights.

In August 2022, Davies, along with former Jeopardy! Clue Crew member Sarah Whitcomb Foss, began hosting a podcast about the game show entitled Inside Jeopardy! which takes a look behind the scenes from the quiz show like gameplay analysis, behind-the-scenes stories, official announcements, and special interviews.

Personal life 
On December 28, 1989, Davies married Selena Richards in Reno, Nevada. The couple divorced in 1992. He later married documentary producer Claude Davies until their divorce. He had a daughter, Brea, through his relationship with Selena and three children through his relationship with Claude. Davies splits his time between homes in New York and Los Angeles. 

He is a fan of Chelsea F.C.

Filmography

Notes

References

External links 

ESPN blog archive of Michael Davies

1966 births
Living people
People from Blackheath, London
People from New York City
Alumni of the University of Edinburgh
English television producers
English expatriates in the United States
English podcasters
Jeopardy!